The GWR 5101 Class or 'Large Prairie' is a class of 2-6-2T steam locomotives of the Great Western Railway.

History 

The 5101 Class were medium-sized tank engines used for suburban and local passenger services all over the Great Western Railway system. The class was an updated version, by Collett, of Churchward's 1903 3100/5100 Class.

The original 40 members of the 3100 class were renumbered 5100 and 5111 to 5149 in 1927. The first batches of 5101s filled in the numbers 5101 to 5110 and extended the class from 5150 to 5189. Bunkers were of the standard Collett design with greater coal capacity. The 5100 number series was exhausted in 1934, and further new locomotives were numbered from 4100. The last 20 were built after nationalisation. 

As both freight and passenger traffic on branch lines declined post-World War II with increasing volumes of private motor cars, and replacement on urban services by diesel-powered rail cars, the bulk of the class found itself allocated to various mainline support duties, mainly banking and piloting, often on the South Devon Banks on the Exeter to Plymouth Line, or around the Severn Tunnel on the South Wales Main Line.

However, the pilot locomotive usually came off at Pilning. Several of this group were sold for scrap to Woodham Brothers and consequently have survived into preservation.

Accidents and incidents
On 30 November 1948, locomotive 4150 was running round its train at  when it was in collision with a passenger train hauled by 5022 Wigmore Castle, which had overrun signals. Eight passengers were injured.

Withdrawal
The below list shows when all of the original 5101's and later 4100's were withdrawn from service.

Preservation 
Ten of the class were preserved after withdrawal in the 1960s (six built in the 1930s before World War II and four built after the war in the late 1940s, one of which under the British Railways banner). As of 2023, six have run in preservation, one is under restoration, one is still in scrapyard condition, one has acted as a donor locomotive for other projects, and one has been rebuilt into a tender engine:

Models
Graham Farish manufacture a model of the Large Prairie in N scale. Hornby have manufactured two models of the class in 00 gauge in both Great Western and British railway liveries; the first was based on a 1980's Airfix model of the engine, the second was a 2020 re-tooled model with a 5 pole motor. Dapol have a 00 gauge model due for release in q4 2021; this has both GWR and BR livery versions planned. Heljan are planning on producing a model of the large prairie in O gauge in 2017. Sonic Models have announced they producing an N scale model, due for release in April/May.

See also
GWR 3100/5100 Class (1906)
GWR 3150 Class
GWR 6100 Class
 GWR 3100 Class (1938)
GWR 8100 Class
List of GWR standard classes with two outside cylinders

References

External links 

 5101 tank class
 4144 - 2-6-2T
 The 4150 Fund
 The 5164 Website
 4160 History

2-6-2T locomotives
5101 Class
Railway locomotives introduced in 1929
Standard gauge steam locomotives of Great Britain
1′C1′ h2t locomotives